Moorpark Football Club, also known as Moorpark Amateurs, was a Scottish football team located in the town of Renfrew that competed in the Scottish Cup from 1914 to 1949.

History

The club was founded in 1906 by boys from Moorpark School in Renfrew, and was originally known as Moorpark Crusaders, changing the club name in 1920–21.

Scottish Cup

As a senior club, the club was entitled to enter the Scottish Cup and did so from 1914 to 1949.  The club reached the first round proper (last 64) seven times, but never won through to the second round.

In order to play in the competition proper, the club had to win through at least two rounds of the Scottish Qualifying Cup; in 1928–29 the club achieved this thanks to getting two byes. The best run the club had in the Qualifying Cup competition was reaching the semi-final of the northern section (fourth round) in 1937–38, losing 2–0 to Blairgowrie F.C., which was also the last time the club made the first round proper; at that stage the club lost 5–2 to Larbert Amateurs.

The club never came close to winning a first round tie, although it was unfortunate in 1928–29 against Armadale, to be reduced to ten men for much of the match due to injury. In 1936–37, the club was drawn at home to Hamilton Academical, and tried to switch the tie to the Acas' Douglas Park (for a better gate) on the basis that "part of their barricade was down". The Scottish Football Association was taking a hard line against switching ties and the game took place at Newmains, attracting an attendance of nearly 1,000, and a gate of £35. In the match itself, Hamilton took a three goal lead in the first quarter of an hour, and went in at half-time 4–0 up; the match ended 7–1 to the visitors.

Amateur competitions

The club had a lot more success on the amateur field before World War 2.  The club won the Scottish Amateur Cup in 1923–24, beating Greenock High School Former Pupils in the final, and was twice runner-up.  The club also took the West of Scotland Amateur Cup in 1923–24, a double few clubs achieved.

The club also won the Scottish Amateur Football League in 1922–23, 1924–25, and 1925–26.

Post-war

After its last Scottish Cup entry, the club continued at a much lower level, leaving the West of Scotland League for sixth division of the Paisley & District Amateur League in 1983, and in 1987 the club won the Victoria Cup, for amateur sides in Renfrewshire, giving the club its first trophy for 20 years.

By reaching the final of the same competition in 1998, the club qualified to play in the Renfrewshire Cup for the last time.

Ground

The club played at Newmains Park in Renfrew.

Colours

The club played in white shirts for most of its pre-war existence, briefly changing to black with a white collar from 1925 to 1927.  After World War 2, the club changed to red. By 1987 the club was wearing blue and black striped shirts with black shorts.

Notable figures

Evelyn Morrison, centre-forward for the club until 1927.
Bob Paton, who joined Partick Thistle from the club in 1924.
James Fleming, President of the Scottish FA, was a representative of Moorpark in the 1930s.

References

External links
Cup results

Defunct football clubs in Scotland
Football in Renfrewshire